Oza dos Ríos was a municipality in the province of A Coruña in the autonomous community of Galicia in northwestern Spain. It belongs to the comarca of Betanzos. On June 6, 2013, the Xunta de Galicia government approved the decree the merger of the municipality with Cesuras, which created the Oza-Cesuras municipality.

References

Municipalities in the Province of A Coruña